The New Quiz Kids was a short-lived television series, based on the 1950s game show Quiz Kids. Two separate seasons were produced in Canada in 1978-1979 by the Global Television Network in association with RKO Television and Columbia Pictures.

Episodes were rebroadcast several times in the following seasons. The host was a young Terry David Mulligan. Five high school students competed in each episode, with the top three earning the right to continue. Michael Mullerbeck of University of Toronto Schools earned the most appearances (33), followed by Bettina Weber (22) of Silverthorn CI, and John Chew (11), also of UTS.

External links
Line producer's credit
Canadian government production record

1970s Canadian game shows
Global Television Network original programming
Student quiz television series
1978 Canadian television series debuts
1979 Canadian television series endings
Television series by Sony Pictures Television